On Praying Ground is an album by the American musician Doc Watson, released in 1990. It is a collection of gospel songs. The version of "I'm Gonna Lay My Burdens Down" was inspired by Mississippi John Hurt's arrangement.

At the Grammy Awards of 1991, On Praying Ground won the Grammy Award for Best Traditional Folk Album.

Track listing
 "You Must Come in at the Door" (Sunny Skylar, Doc Watson) – 2:15
 "Precious Lord" (Daniels, Jones) – 3:30
 "On Praying Ground" (Traditional) – 2:25
 "I'll Live On" (T.J. Laney) – 2:34
 "Gathering Buds" (James Rowe, James Vaughan) – 2:56
 "Beautiful Golden Somewhere" (L. H. Parthemore) – 3:14
 "I'm Gonna Lay My Burdens Down" (Traditional) – 3:38
 "We'll Work 'Til Jesus Comes" (William Miller, Elizabeth Mills) – 2:43
 "The Ninety & Nine" (Elizabeth Clephane, Ira Sankey) – 2:31
 "Farther Along" (Rev. W. B. Stevens) – 4:15
 "Christmas Lullaby" (Traditional) – 2:04
 "Did Christ O'Er Sinners Weep" (Benjamin Beddome) – 2:12
 "Uncloudy Day" (Josiah K. Alwood) – 3:00

Personnel
Doc Watson – guitar, banjo, harmonica, vocals
T. Michael Coleman – bass, harmony vocals
Sam Bush – mandolin
Jerry Douglas – dobro
Alan O'Bryant – guitar, harmony vocals
Jack Lawrence – guitar
Roland White – guitar, harmony vocals
Stuart Duncan – fiddle, mandolin, guitar, harmony vocals
Roy "Junior" Huskey – bass
Production notes
Produced by T. Michael Coleman
Engineered by Bill Vorn Dick
Mastered by James Lloyd
Photography by Will & Deni McIntyre

References

Doc Watson albums
1990 albums
Sugar Hill Records albums